

Kathai Conservation Park is a protected area in the Australian state of South Australia located on the Eyre Peninsula in the gazetted locality of Duck Ponds about  south-west of Port Lincoln.

The conservation park is dominated by an “open mallee forest” of coastal white mallee over an understorey consisting of tall shrubs of dryland tea-tree. The purple-flowered mallee which is considered to be “regionally rare“ is found within its boundaries.

The conservation park is classified as an IUCN Category III protected area.

See also
Protected areas of South Australia

References

External links
Webpage for Kathai Conservation Park on the Protected Planet website

Conservation parks of South Australia
Protected areas established in 1985
1985 establishments in Australia
Eyre Peninsula